RCAR may refer to:
Religious Coalition for Reproductive Choice, an abortion rights organization
Research Council for Automobile Repairs, an international body of insurance industry financed automotive research centres
Real Club Astur de Regatas, a yacht club in Spain